is a mountain in the Kitami Mountains. It is located in Takinoue, Hokkaidō, Japan.

References
 Geographical Survey Institute

Mountains of Hokkaido